is a route that connects the federal state capital of Kiel to Rendsburg. This route serves to further ease the ground transportation route  from Kiel to Schleswig and into Scandinavia.

Exit list

External links 

210
A210